Marian A. Peterson Middle School is a public middle school (formerly Peterson High School) in the Santa Clara Unified School District, located in the city of Sunnyvale, California, at 1380 Rosalia Avenue. It teaches 899 students from 6th to 8th grade, with 39 teachers. Peterson is 1 mile north of Apple's new campus, 2 miles southeast of downtown Sunnyvale, and 0.7 miles west of the local arterial road Lawrence Expressway.

Layout 

Peterson has an area of roughly 47 acres, and is composed of a farm, a track, a field, and a main campus, forming a jagged rectangle.

Entering from the large parking lot, 3 gyms are visible, the "Big Gym", the "Small Gym", and the "Mini Gym". Behind are locker rooms, a workout room, and 2 swimming pools. Straight ahead are 8 fenced tennis courts, a large asphalted area with 10 basketball courts, 3 tennis walls, and a fitness center. The 1/4 mile track is elevated 5 feet, and to the right of it are bleachers. An 8.3 acre field with 2 solar panel arrays and a 11.3 acre farm exist west of the track.

Inside the main campus area are 53 classrooms in wings A through G. An open lawn, "Pirates' Cove", is bounded by Wings E, D, and G. Another open area, known as "The Quad", ringed by 17 ponderosa pines, is surrounded by the multipurpose room, Wing A, and the front office.

East of Pirates' Cove is the 2 acre Bryan Osborne Nature Area, with habitats ranging from forests to marshes. It was founded and constructed in 1969 by Dan Baer and Bryan Osborne, as an outdoor classroom.

Academics 
59% of Peterson's students are proficient in grade level math, compared to the state average of 38%. 68% of Peterson's students are proficient in grade level English, compared to the state average of 49%.

Peterson's Algebra 1 participation rate for 7th and 8th graders is 75%, compared to the state average of 25%. The pass rate is 23%, compared to the state average of 79%. 

The school maintains a 75% passing rate in order to move on to high school.

Extracurriculars & Electives 
Peterson has after school clubs and in school electives.

Some of those clubs include:

 Science Club
 Japan Club
 Math Club
 Robotics Club
 Woods Club
 Bridge Club
 Dungeons and Dragons club

It also has electives like its Culinary Arts program and music classes.

Demographics 
Peterson is 40% Asian, 25% White, 25% Hispanic, 5% Multiracial, 2% Black, 1% Hawaiian Native or Pacific Islander, and 1% American Indian or Alaska Native.

References

External links 
 

Public middle schools in California
Sunnyvale, California